

28001–28100 

|-id=004
| 28004 Terakawa || 1997 XA || Syoji Terakawa, expert mirror polisher. || 
|-id=007
| 28007 Galhassin ||  || GAL Hassin is an International Center for Astronomy in Isnello (Sicily, Italy) undertaking science education and outreach activities, along with advanced astronomical research. The latter will be implemented with the upcoming 1-meter Wide-field Mufara Telescope (WMT). This facility will be mostly devoted to NEO observations. || 
|-id=019
| 28019 Warchal ||  || Bohdan Warchal (1930–2000), Slovak violinist, conductor and educator, member of the Slovak Philharmonic Orchestra and chief conductor and soloist of the Slovak Chamber Orchestra || 
|-id=037
| 28037 Williammonts ||  || William Lowell Monts (born 1997) is a finalist in the 2012 Broadcom MASTERS, a math and science competition for middle-school students, for his physical sciences project. || 
|-id=038
| 28038 Nicoleodzer ||  || Nicole Brooke Odzer (born 1998) is a finalist in the 2012 Broadcom MASTERS, a math and science competition for middle-school students, for her environmental sciences project. || 
|-id=039
| 28039 Mauraoei ||  || Maura Clare Oei (born 1998) is a finalist in the 2012 Broadcom MASTERS, a math and science competition for middle-school students, for her engineering project. || 
|-id=042
| 28042 Mayapatel ||  || Maya Mona Patel (born 1998) is a finalist in the 2012 Broadcom MASTERS, a math and science competition for middle-school students, for her earth and space sciences project. || 
|-id=043
| 28043 Mabelwheeler ||  || Mabel Elizabeth Wheeler (born 2000) is a finalist in the 2012 Broadcom MASTERS, a math and science competition for middle-school students, for her physical sciences project. She attends the Cherry Hill Elementary School, Orem, Utah || 
|-id=045
| 28045 Johnwilkins ||  || John C. Wilkins (born 2000) is a finalist in the 2012 Broadcom MASTERS, a math and science competition for middle-school students, for his earth and space sciences project. || 
|-id=048
| 28048 Camilleyoke ||  || Camille Virginia Yoke (born 1998) is a finalist in the 2012 Broadcom MASTERS, a math and science competition for middle-school students, for her physical sciences project. || 
|-id=049
| 28049 Yvonnealex ||  || Yvonne Alexander mentored a finalist in the 2012 Broadcom MASTERS, a math and science competition for middle-school students. || 
|-id=050
| 28050 Asekomeh ||  || Demetrius Asekomeh mentored a finalist in the 2012 Broadcom MASTERS, a math and science competition for middle-school students. || 
|-id=051
| 28051 Bruzzone ||  || Juan Sebastian Bruzzone (born 1981) is a Uruguayan Postdoctoral Researcher at the NASA Goddard Space Flight Center. He specializes in the study of meteors, meteoroids, debris disks and planetary systems, including developments in processing of radar, polarimetric and optical observations of meteors. || 
|-id=059
| 28059 Kiliaan ||  || Cornelis Kiliaan, 16th-century Flemish linguist || 
|-id=068
| 28068 Stephbillings ||  || Stephanie Billings mentored a finalist in the 2012 Broadcom MASTERS, a math and science competition for middle-school students. || 
|-id=072
| 28072 Lindbowerman ||  || Lindsay Bowerman mentored a finalist in the 2012 Broadcom MASTERS, a math and science competition for middle-school students. || 
|-id=073
| 28073 Fohner ||  || Nancy Fohner mentored a finalist in the 2012 Broadcom MASTERS, a math and science competition for middle-school students. || 
|-id=074
| 28074 Matgallagher ||  || Matthew Gallagher mentored a finalist in the 2012 Broadcom MASTERS, a math and science competition for middle-school students. || 
|-id=075
| 28075 Emilyhoffman ||  || Emily Hoffman mentored a finalist in the 2012 Broadcom MASTERS, a math and science competition for middle-school students. || 
|-id=077
| 28077 Hard ||  || Michael W. Hard (born 1937) is a long-time friend of Lowell Observatory who has championed the Observatory in many ways. He had a 39-year senior executive career in banking in Arizona and served as a trustee on two foundation boards of directors. Michael was also very active in the community after retirement. || 
|-id=078
| 28078 Mauricehilleman ||  || Maurice Hilleman, American microbiologist who developed 8 of the 14 most common vaccines in use today. || 
|-id=081
| 28081 Carriehudson ||  || Carrie Hudson mentored a finalist in the 2012 Broadcom MASTERS, a math and science competition for middle-school students. || 
|-id=091
| 28091 Mikekane ||  || Michael Kane mentored a finalist in the 2012 Broadcom MASTERS, a math and science competition for middle-school students. || 
|-id=092
| 28092 Joannekear ||  || Joanne Kear mentored a finalist in the 2012 Broadcom MASTERS, a math and science competition for middle-school students. || 
|-id=093
| 28093 Staceylevoit ||  || Stacey Levoit mentored a finalist in the 2012 Broadcom MASTERS, a math and science competition for middle-school students. || 
|-id=094
| 28094 Michellewis ||  || Michelle Lewis mentored a finalist in the 2012 Broadcom MASTERS, a math and science competition for middle-school students. || 
|-id=095
| 28095 Seanmahoney ||  || Sean Mahoney mentored a finalist in the 2012 Broadcom MASTERS, a math and science competition for middle-school students. || 
|-id=096
| 28096 Kathrynmarsh ||  || Kathryn Marsh mentored a finalist in the 2012 Broadcom MASTERS, a math and science competition for middle-school students. || 
|}

28101–28200 

|-id=103
| 28103 Benmcpheron ||  || Ben McPheron mentored a finalist in the 2012 Broadcom MASTERS, a math and science competition for middle-school students. || 
|-id=105
| 28105 Santallo ||  || Roland Santallo (born 1943), an amateur astronomer observing from Tahiti. || 
|-id=107
| 28107 Sapar ||  || Arved-Ervin Sapar (born 1933) carried out pioneering studies of cosmology in Tartu, Estonia. He took into account the photon and neutrino background in cosmological equations. His contribution to modelling of stellar atmospheres has found acknowledgement among the astronomical community || 
|-id=108
| 28108 Sydneybarnes ||  || Sydney Barnes (born 1967), an assistant astronomer at Lowell Observatory, enjoys working at the interface between theory and observations, particularly on topics related to the global properties of stars, and their changes with stellar age || 
|-id=125
| 28125 Juliomiguez ||  || Julio Miguez mentored a finalist in the 2012 Broadcom MASTERS, a math and science competition for middle-school students. || 
|-id=126
| 28126 Nydegger ||  || Jason Nydegger mentored a finalist in the 2012 Broadcom MASTERS, a math and science competition for middle-school students. || 
|-id=127
| 28127 Ogden-Stenerson ||  || Carolyn Ogden-Stenerson mentored a finalist in the 2012 Broadcom MASTERS, a math and science competition for middle-school students. || 
|-id=128
| 28128 Cynthrossman ||  || Cynthia Rossman mentored a finalist in the 2012 Broadcom MASTERS, a math and science competition for middle-school students || 
|-id=129
| 28129 Teresummers ||  || Teresa Summers mentored a finalist in the 2012 Broadcom MASTERS, a math and science competition for middle-school students || 
|-id=130
| 28130 Troemper ||  || Brett Troemper mentored a finalist in the 2012 Broadcom MASTERS, a math and science competition for middle-school students. || 
|-id=131
| 28131 Dougwelch ||  || Doug Welch mentored a finalist in the 2012 Broadcom MASTERS, a math and science competition for middle-school students. || 
|-id=132
| 28132 Karenzobel ||  || Karen Zobel mentored a finalist in the 2012 Broadcom MASTERS, a math and science competition for middle-school students. || 
|-id=133
| 28133 Kylebardwell ||  || Kyle Thomas Bardwell (born 1993) was awarded first place in the 2011 Intel International Science and Engineering Fair for his animal sciences project. || 
|-id=136
| 28136 Chasegross ||  || Chase Carter Gross (born 1995) was awarded second place in the 2011 Intel International Science and Engineering Fair for his animal sciences project. || 
|-id=137
| 28137 Helenyao ||  || Helen Yao (born 1993) was awarded second place in the 2011 Intel International Science and Engineering Fair for her animal sciences project. || 
|-id=141
| 28141 ten Brummelaar || 1998 TC || Theo ten Brummelaar (born 1962) is an Australian-American astronomer at the Georgia State University. He is the Director of the CHARA Array and a leader in the development of the use of optical interferometry throughout the astronomical community. || 
|-id=151
| 28151 Markknopfler ||  || Mark Knopfler (born 1949), a Scottish composer, guitarist and singer, who founded Dire Straits in 1977. || 
|-id=155
| 28155 Chengzhendai ||  || Chengzhen Li Dai (born 1994) was awarded second place in the 2011 Intel International Science and Engineering Fair for his animal sciences project. || 
|-id=156
| 28156 McColl ||  || Adrienne Brooke McColl (born 1993) was awarded best of category and first place in the 2011 Intel International Science and Engineering Fair for her animal sciences project. || 
|-id=159
| 28159 Giuricich ||  || Alessio Pio Giuricich (born 1994) was awarded second place in the 2011 Intel International Science and Engineering Fair for his behavioral and social sciences project. He attends the Bishops Diocesan College, Cape Town, Western Cape, South Africa || 
|-id=161
| 28161 Neelpatel ||  || Neel Sanjay Patel (born 1994) was awarded second place in the 2011 Intel International Science and Engineering Fair for his behavioral and social sciences project. || 
|-id=163
| 28163 Lorikim ||  || Lori Kim (born 1993) was awarded second place in the 2011 Intel International Science and Engineering Fair for her behavioral and social sciences project. || 
|-id=165
| 28165 Bayanmashat ||  || Bayan Mohammed Mashat (born 1995) was awarded first place in the 2011 Intel International Science and Engineering Fair for her behavioral and social sciences project. || 
|-id=167
| 28167 Andrewkim ||  || Andrew Wooyoung Kim (born 1993) was awarded best of category and first place in the 2011 Intel International Science and Engineering Fair for his behavioral and social sciences project. || 
|-id=168
| 28168 Evanolin ||  || Evan Daniel Olin (born 1994) was awarded second place in the 2011 Intel International Science and Engineering Fair for his behavioral and social sciences team project. || 
|-id=169
| 28169 Cathconte ||  || Catherine Marie Conte (born 1995) was awarded second place in the 2011 Intel International Science and Engineering Fair for her behavioral and social sciences team project. || 
|-id=171
| 28171 Diannahu ||  || Dianna Hu (born 1993) was awarded best of category and first place in the 2011 Intel International Science and Engineering Fair for her biochemistry project. || 
|-id=173
| 28173 Hisakichi ||  || Hisakichi Sato (1902–1989), the discoverer's father || 
|-id=174
| 28174 Harue ||  || Harue Sato (1909–2001), the discoverer's mother || 
|-id=182
| 28182 Chadharris ||  || Chad Lawrence Harris (born 1992) was awarded second place in the 2011 Intel International Science and Engineering Fair for his biochemistry project. || 
|-id=183
| 28183 Naidu ||  || Yamini T. Naidu (born 1995) was awarded first place in the 2011 Intel International Science and Engineering Fair for her biochemistry project. || 
|-id=184
| 28184 Vaishnavirao ||  || Vaishnavi Lakshminarasimha Rao (born 1995) was awarded second place in the 2011 Intel International Science and Engineering Fair for her biochemistry project. || 
|-id=196
| 28196 Szeged ||  || Szeged, Hungary † || 
|}

28201–28300 

|-
| 28201 Lifubin ||  || Li Fubin (born 1993) was awarded second place in the 2011 Intel International Science and Engineering Fair for his biochemistry team project. || 
|-id=204
| 28204 Liyakang ||  || Li Yakang (born 1992) was awarded second place in the 2011 Intel International Science and Engineering Fair for his biochemistry team project. || 
|-id=206
| 28206 Haozhongning ||  || Hao Zhongning (born 1995) was awarded second place in the 2011 Intel International Science and Engineering Fair for his biochemistry team project. || 
|-id=207
| 28207 Blakesmith ||  || Blake Edward Smith (born 1994) was awarded first place in the 2011 Intel International Science and Engineering Fair for his cellular and molecular biology project. || 
|-id=208
| 28208 Timtrippel ||  || Timothy D. Trippel (born 1993) was awarded second place in the 2011 Intel International Science and Engineering Fair for his cellular and molecular biology project. || 
|-id=209
| 28209 Chatterjee ||  || Ishan Chatterjee (born 1994) was awarded second place in the 2011 Intel International Science and Engineering Fair for his cellular and molecular biology project. || 
|-id=210
| 28210 Howardfeng ||  || Howard Feng (born 1995) was awarded second place in the 2011 Intel International Science and Engineering Fair for his cellular and molecular biology project. || 
|-id=220
| 28220 York ||  || York, UK † || 
|-id=222
| 28222 Neilpathak ||  || Neil Pathak (born 1992) was awarded second place in the 2011 Intel International Science and Engineering Fair for his chemistry project. || 
|-id=235
| 28235 Kasparvonbraun ||  || Kaspar von Braun (born 1971) is a German astronomer at the Lowell Observatory.  His research interests in optical interferometry, stellar fundamental properties, and precision photometry guide his work in characterizing extrasolar planets. || 
|-id=242
| 28242 Mingantu ||  || Ming Antu (1692–c. 1765), a Chinese astronomer and mathematician of the Qing Dynasty. || 
|-id=245
| 28245 Cruise ||  || Sallie Cruise (born 1958) is a singer, musician and philanthropist from Hobart, Australia. Her stalwart support of the arts and literature have improved the communities around her. || 
|-id=248
| 28248 Barthelemy ||  || Pierre Barthélémy (born 1967), a French scientific journalist working mainly for Le Monde. || 
|-id=251
| 28251 Gerbaldi ||  || Michele Gerbaldi (born 1944),  a French astronomer specializing in stellar astrophysics. || 
|-id=254
| 28254 Raghrama ||  || Raghavendra Ramachanderan (born 1994) was awarded best of category and first place in the 2011 Intel International Science and Engineering Fair for his chemistry project. || 
|-id=272
| 28272 Mikejanner ||  || Michael Leonard Janner (born 1996) was awarded second place in the 2011 Intel International Science and Engineering Fair for his chemistry project. || 
|-id=273
| 28273 Maianhvu ||  || Mai-Anh N. Vu (born 1995) was awarded first place in the 2011 Intel International Science and Engineering Fair for her chemistry team project. || 
|-id=275
| 28275 Quoc-Bao ||  || Quoc-Bao Duy Nguyen (born 1994) was awarded first place in the 2011 Intel International Science and Engineering Fair for his chemistry team project. || 
|-id=276
| 28276 Filipnaiser ||  || Filip Naiser (born 1992) was awarded second place in the 2011 Intel International Science and Engineering Fair for his computer science project. || 
|-id=277
| 28277 Chengherngyi ||  || Cheng Yi Herng (born 1993) was awarded first place in the 2011 Intel International Science and Engineering Fair for his computer science project. || 
|-id=287
| 28287 Osmanov ||  || Gadzhi Shamil'evich Osmanov (born 1994) was awarded second place in the 2011 Intel International Science and Engineering Fair for his computer science project. || 
|-id=295
| 28295 Heyizheng ||  || Gadzhi Shamil'evich Osmanov (born 1994) was awarded second place in the 2011 Intel International Science and Engineering Fair for his computer science project. || 
|-id=299
| 28299 Kanghaoyan ||  || Kang Haoyan (born 1993) was awarded second place in the 2011 Intel International Science and Engineering Fair for his computer science team project. || 
|}

28301–28400 

|-id=305
| 28305 Wangjiayi ||  || Wang Jiayi (born 1993) was awarded second place in the 2011 Intel International Science and Engineering Fair for her computer science team project. || 
|-id=309
| 28309 Ericfein ||  || Eric E. Fein (born 1993) was awarded second place in the 2011 Intel International Science and Engineering Fair for his earth and planetary science project. || 
|-id=317
| 28317 Aislinndeely ||  || Aislinn Deely (born 1993) was awarded second place in the 2011 Intel International Science and Engineering Fair for her earth and planetary science project. || 
|-id=318
| 28318 Janecox ||  || Jane M. Cox (born 1994) was awarded best of category and first place in the 2011 Intel International Science and Engineering Fair for her earth and planetary science project. || 
|-id=321
| 28321 Arnabdey ||  || Arnab Dey (born 1994) was awarded second place in the 2011 Intel International Science and Engineering Fair for his electrical and mechanical engineering project. || 
|-id=322
| 28322 Kaeberich ||  || Jan Kaeberich (born 1992) was awarded second place in the 2011 Intel International Science and Engineering Fair for his electrical and mechanical engineering project. || 
|-id=324
| 28324 Davidcampeau ||  || David Alexandre Joseph Campeau (born 1995) was awarded second place in the 2011 Intel International Science and Engineering Fair for his electrical and mechanical engineering project. || 
|-id=331
| 28331 Dianebérard ||  || Diane Bérard (born 1990) is a research engineer at the Paris Observatory (Meudon, France). Her work includes observing stellar occultations to study small-body ring systems (Chariklo and Haumea) and astronomy outreach. || 
|-id=340
| 28340 Yukihiro ||  || Yukihiro Adachi, Japanese member of the Matsue Astronomy Club and an observing partner of the discoverer || 
|-id=341
| 28341 Bingaman ||  || Missouri-born Kory Bingaman (born 1984) is a talented artist and graphic novelist || 
|-id=342
| 28342 Haverhals ||  || Peter Haverhals (born 1950) is a retired teacher, formerly of Watson Groen Christian School. He taught junior and senior high school students for almost two decades, inspiring students in math, literature, and the fundamentals of good judgment. || 
|-id=343
| 28343 Florcalandra ||  || Maria Florencia Calandra (born 1990) is a member of the Planetary Science Group of the Universidad Nacional de San Juan (Argentina). She studies the formation and evolution of Oort clouds in the Solar and exoplanetary systems. || 
|-id=345
| 28345 Akivabarnun ||  || Akiva Bar-Nun (1940–2017) studied the thermal evolution of comets, planetary atmospheres of Jupiter, Saturn and Titan, and chemical processes on Mars, the Moon, and other bodies. Bar-Nun was a contributor to the Rosetta mission as head of Israel's space agency. || 
|-id=346
| 28346 Kent ||  || Kent Hodgson, teacher and author || 
|-id=351
| 28351 Andrewfeldman ||  || Andrew Beekman Feldman (born 1994) was awarded second place in the 2011 Intel International Science and Engineering Fair for his electrical and mechanical engineering project. || 
|-id=353
| 28353 Chrisnielsen ||  || Christopher Stephen Nielsen (born 1993) was awarded first place in the 2011 Intel International Science and Engineering Fair for his electrical and mechanical engineering project. || 
|-id=364
| 28364 Bruceelmegreen ||  || Bruce Elmegreen (born 1950), is an American astronomer who experimented on devices and materials at IBM Research, the research and development division for IBM. His research included the interstellar medium, galaxy formation and evolution, and the formation of stars. || 
|-id=366
| 28366 Verkuil ||  || Robert Huntington Verkuil (born 1994) was awarded second place in the 2011 Intel International Science and Engineering Fair for his electrical and mechanical engineering project. || 
|-id=376
| 28376 Atifjaved ||  || Atif Javed (born 1992) was awarded second place in the 2011 Intel International Science and Engineering Fair for his electrical and mechanical engineering team project. || 
|-id=382
| 28382 Stevengillen ||  || Steven Donald Gillen (born 1993) was awarded second place in the 2011 Intel International Science and Engineering Fair for his electrical and mechanical engineering team project. || 
|-id=390
| 28390 Demjohopkins ||  || Demitri Joseph Hopkins (born 1993) was awarded best of category and first place in the 2011 Intel International Science and Engineering Fair for his electrical and mechanical engineering team project. He attends the Merlo Station High School, Beaverton, Oregon, U.S.A || 
|-id=394
| 28394 Mittag-Leffler ||  || Magnus Gustav Mittag-Leffler (1848–1927), a professor in Helsinki and Stockholm. || 
|-id=396
| 28396 Eymann ||  || Raymond Eymann, a French amateur astronomer. || 
|-id=397
| 28397 Forrestbetton ||  || Forrest Evan Betton (born 1993) was awarded best of category and first place in the 2011 Intel International Science and Engineering Fair for his electrical and mechanical engineering team project. || 
|-id=398
| 28398 Ericthomas ||  || Eric Michael Thomas (born 1992) was awarded best of category and first place in the 2011 Intel International Science and Engineering Fair for his electrical and mechanical engineering team project. || 
|-id=400
| 28400 Morgansinko ||  || Morgan Walker Sinko (born 1994) was awarded second place in the 2011 Intel International Science and Engineering Fair for his environmental management project. || 
|}

28401–28500 

|-id=402
| 28402 Matthewkim ||  || Matthew Jaebol Kim (born 1993) was awarded second place in the 2011 Intel International Science and Engineering Fair for his environmental management project. || 
|-id=407
| 28407 Meghanarao ||  || Meghana Vijay Rao (born 1995) was awarded second place in the 2011 Intel International Science and Engineering Fair for her environmental management project. || 
|-id=411
| 28411 Xiuqicao ||  || Xiuqi Cao (born 1994) was awarded first place in the 2011 Intel International Science and Engineering Fair for his environmental management team project. || 
|-id=415
| 28415 Yingxiong ||  || Ying Xiong (born 1995) was awarded first place in the 2011 Intel International Science and Engineering Fair for his environmental management team project. || 
|-id=416
| 28416 Ngqin ||  || Ng Qin Xiang (born 1993) was awarded second place in the 2011 Intel International Science and Engineering Fair for his environmental management team project. || 
|-id=417
| 28417 Leewei ||  || Lee Liang Matthew Wei (born 1993) was awarded second place in the 2011 Intel International Science and Engineering Fair for his environmental management team project. || 
|-id=418
| 28418 Pornwasu ||  || Pornwasu Pongtheerawan (born 1994) was awarded best of category and first place in the 2011 Intel International Science and Engineering Fair for his environmental management team project. || 
|-id=419
| 28419 Tanpitcha ||  || Tanpitcha Phongchaipaiboon (born 1993) was awarded best of category and first place in the 2011 Intel International Science and Engineering Fair for her environmental management team project. || 
|-id=425
| 28425 Sungkanit ||  || Arada Sungkanit (born 1994) was awarded best of category and first place in the 2011 Intel International Science and Engineering Fair for her environmental management team project. || 
|-id=426
| 28426 Sangani ||  || Kunal Ashok Sangani (born 1994) was awarded first place in the 2011 Intel International Science and Engineering Fair for his environmental management team project. || 
|-id=427
| 28427 Gidwani ||  || Mishka Gidwani (born 1993) was awarded first place in the 2011 Intel International Science and Engineering Fair for her environmental management team project. || 
|-id=428
| 28428 Ankurvaishnav ||  || Ankur Kanjibhai Vaishnav (born 1994) was awarded second place in the 2011 Intel International Science and Engineering Fair for his environmental management team project. || 
|-id=433
| 28433 Samarquez ||  || Samantha Marie Marquez (born 1995) was awarded best of category and first place in the 2011 Intel International Science and Engineering Fair for her materials and bioengineering project. || 
|-id=438
| 28438 Venkateswaran ||  || Shyam Venkateswaran (born 1993) was awarded second place in the 2011 Intel International Science and Engineering Fair for his materials and bioengineering project. || 
|-id=439
| 28439 Miguelreyes ||  || Miguel Arnold Silverio Reyes (born 1995) was awarded second place in the 2011 Intel International Science and Engineering Fair for his materials and bioengineering project. || 
|-id=442
| 28442 Nicholashuey ||  || Nicholas Michael Huey (born 1992) was awarded second place in the 2011 Intel International Science and Engineering Fair for his materials and bioengineering project. || 
|-id=443
| 28443 Crisara ||  || Alexander Raymond Crisara (born 1994) was awarded first place in the 2011 Intel International Science and Engineering Fair for his materials and bioengineering team project. || 
|-id=444
| 28444 Alexrabii ||  || Alexander Jahan Rabii (born 1996) was awarded first place in the 2011 Intel International Science and Engineering Fair for his materials and bioengineering team project. || 
|-id=446
| 28446 Davlantes ||  || Christopher Joseph Davlantes (born 1993) was awarded second place in the 2011 Intel International Science and Engineering Fair for his energy and transportation project. || 
|-id=447
| 28447 Arjunmathur ||  || Arjun Mathur (born 1993) was awarded second place in the 2011 Intel International Science and Engineering Fair for his energy and transportation project. || 
|-id=449
| 28449 Ericlau ||  || Eric Lau (born 1994) was awarded second place in the 2011 Intel International Science and Engineering Fair for his energy and transportation project. || 
|-id=450
| 28450 Saravolz ||  || Sara Ellen Volz (born 1995) was awarded first place in the 2011 Intel International Science and Engineering Fair for her energy and transportation project. || 
|-id=451
| 28451 Tylerhoward ||  || Tyler Trettel Howard (born 1993) was awarded second place in the 2011 Intel International Science and Engineering Fair for his energy and transportation project. || 
|-id=452
| 28452 Natkondamuri ||  || Nathan Sai Kondamuri (born 1994) was awarded best of category and first place in the 2011 Intel International Science and Engineering Fair for his energy and transportation project. || 
|-id=453
| 28453 Alexcecil ||  || Alexander Michael Cecil (born 1993) was awarded second place in the 2011 Intel International Science and Engineering Fair for his environmental sciences project. || 
|-id=457
| 28457 Chloeanassis ||  || Chloe Anassis (born 1995) was awarded second place in the 2011 Intel International Science and Engineering Fair for her environmental sciences project. || 
|-id=460
| 28460 Ariannepapa ||  || Arianne Elizabeth Papa (born 1994) was awarded second place in the 2011 Intel International Science and Engineering Fair for her environmental sciences team project. || 
|-id=465
| 28465 Janesmyth ||  || Jane Elizabeth Smyth (born 1993) was awarded second place in the 2011 Intel International Science and Engineering Fair for her environmental sciences team project. || 
|-id=467
| 28467 Maurentejamie ||  || Ruth Maurente Jamie (born 1993) was awarded second place in the 2011 Intel International Science and Engineering Fair for her environmental sciences team project. || 
|-id=468
| 28468 Shichangxu ||  || Shi Changxu, material-scientist-academician of the Chinese Academy of Sciences and the Chinese Academy of Engineering. || 
|-id=474
| 28474 Bustamante ||  || Elisa Bustamante (born 1990) was awarded second place in the 2011 Intel International Science and Engineering Fair for her environmental sciences team project. || 
|-id=475
| 28475 Garrett || 2000 CU || Lawrence Garrett (born 1959) has been the Assistant Coordinator for the Minor Planets Section of the Association of Lunar and Planetary Observers since 1999. He also has several asteroid discoveries to his credit. || 
|-id=479
| 28479 Varlotta ||  || David Varlotta (born 1992) was awarded second place in the 2011 Intel International Science and Engineering Fair for his environmental sciences team project. || 
|-id=480
| 28480 Seojinyoung ||  || Seo Jinyoung (born 1993) was awarded best of category and first place in the 2011 Intel International Science and Engineering Fair for his environmental sciences team project. || 
|-id=481
| 28481 Shindongju ||  || Shin Dongju (born 1993) was awarded best of category and first place in the 2011 Intel International Science and Engineering Fair for his environmental sciences team project. || 
|-id=482
| 28482 Bauerle ||  || Matthew Russel Bauerle (born 1994) was awarded best of category and first place in the 2011 Intel International Science and Engineering Fair for his mathematical sciences project. || 
|-id=483
| 28483 Allenyuan ||  || Allen Yuan (born 1993) was awarded first place in the 2011 Intel International Science and Engineering Fair for his mathematical sciences project. || 
|-id=484
| 28484 Aishwarya ||  || Aishwarya Ananda Vardhana (born 1994) was awarded second place in the 2011 Intel International Science and Engineering Fair for her mathematical sciences project. || 
|-id=485
| 28485 Dastidar ||  || Manosij G. Dastidar (born 1992) was awarded second place in the 2011 Intel International Science and Engineering Fair for his mathematical sciences project. || 
|-id=488
| 28488 Gautam ||  || Simanta Gautam (born 1995) was awarded second place in the 2011 Intel International Science and Engineering Fair for his mathematical sciences project. || 
|-id=492
| 28492 Marik ||  || Miklós Marik, Hungarian astronomer † || 
|-id=493
| 28493 Duncan-Lewis ||  || Christopher Anthony Duncan-Lewis (born 1992) was awarded second place in the 2011 Intel International Science and Engineering Fair for his medicine and health sciences project. || 
|-id=494
| 28494 Jasmine ||  || Jasmine Samaiya Roberts (born 1993) was awarded second place in the 2011 Intel International Science and Engineering Fair for her medicine and health sciences project. || 
|}

28501–28600 

|-id=503
| 28503 Angelazhang ||  || Angela Zhang (born 1994) was awarded first place in the 2011 Intel International Science and Engineering Fair for her medicine and health sciences project. || 
|-id=504
| 28504 Rebeccafaye ||  || Rebecca Faye Alford (born 1994) was awarded second place in the 2011 Intel International Science and Engineering Fair for her medicine and health sciences project. || 
|-id=505
| 28505 Sagarrambhia ||  || Sagar Hitendra Rambhia (born 1994) was awarded first place in the 2011 Intel International Science and Engineering Fair for his medicine and health sciences project. || 
|-id=508
| 28508 Kishore ||  || Kishore Balasubramanian (born 1996) was awarded second place in the 2011 Intel International Science and Engineering Fair for his medicine and health sciences project. || 
|-id=509
| 28509 Feddersen ||  || Matthew Troy Feddersen (born 1993) was awarded best of category and first place in the 2011 Intel International Science and Engineering Fair for his medicine and health sciences team project. || 
|-id=511
| 28511 Marggraff ||  || Blake Marggraff (born 1992) was awarded best in show (the Gordon E. Moore award), best of category, and first place in the 2011 Intel International Science and Engineering Fair for his medicine and health sciences team project. || 
|-id=512
| 28512 Tanyuan ||  || Tan Jin Yuan (born 1993) was awarded second place in the 2011 Intel International Science and Engineering Fair for his microbiology project. || 
|-id=513
| 28513 Guo ||  || Yanping Guo (born 1960) is the mission trajectory designer of the New Horizons Pluto Kuiper Belt mission. || 
|-id=516
| 28516 Möbius ||  || August Ferdinand Möbius, German mathematician and astronomer. || 
|-id=519
| 28519 Sweetman ||  || Michael Sweetman (born 1952) has been an amateur astronomer since the early 1960s, becoming an accomplished artist with his lunar and planetary observations. In recent years he has also been engaged in high-quality imaging of the moon. || 
|-id=521
| 28521 Mattmcintyre ||  || Matthew Karmen McIntyre (born 1992) was awarded second place in the 2011 Intel International Science and Engineering Fair for his microbiology project. || 
|-id=524
| 28524 Ebright ||  || Katherine Yon Ebright (born 1993) was awarded second place in the 2011 Intel International Science and Engineering Fair for her microbiology project. || 
|-id=525
| 28525 Andrewabboud ||  || Andrew Nickolas Abboud (born 1993) was awarded first place in the 2011 Intel International Science and Engineering Fair for his microbiology project. || 
|-id=527
| 28527 Kathleenrose ||  || Kathleen Rose Maguire (born 1993) was awarded second place in the 2011 Intel International Science and Engineering Fair for her microbiology project. || 
|-id=530
| 28530 Shiyimeng ||  || Shi Yimeng (born 1992) was awarded first place in the 2011 Intel International Science and Engineering Fair for her physics and astronomy project. || 
|-id=531
| 28531 Nikbogdanov ||  || Nikita Michael Bogdanov (born 1993) was awarded second place in the 2011 Intel International Science and Engineering Fair for his physics and astronomy project. || 
|-id=533
| 28533 Iansohl ||  || Ian Alexander Sohl (born 1994) was awarded second place in the 2011 Intel International Science and Engineering Fair for his physics and astronomy project.  || 
|-id=534
| 28534 Taylorwilson ||  || Taylor Ramon Wilson (born 1994) was awarded best of category and first place in the 2011 Intel International Science and Engineering Fair for his physics and astronomy project. || 
|-id=535
| 28535 Sungjanet ||  || Sung Janet Yun-Chen (born 1993) was awarded second place in the 2011 Intel International Science and Engineering Fair for her physics and astronomy team project. || 
|-id=536
| 28536 Hunaiwen ||  || Hu Nai-Wen (born 1994) was awarded second place in the 2011 Intel International Science and Engineering Fair for her physics and astronomy team project. || 
|-id=537
| 28537 Kirapowell ||  || Kira Elizabeth Powell (born 1994) was awarded best of category and first place in the 2011 Intel International Science and Engineering Fair for her plant sciences project. || 
|-id=538
| 28538 Ruisong ||  || Rui Song (born 1995) was awarded second place in the 2011 Intel International Science and Engineering Fair for her plant sciences project. || 
|-id=542
| 28542 Cespedes-Nano ||  || Kelvin Russell Cespedes Nano (born 1995) was awarded second place in the 2011 Intel International Science and Engineering Fair for his plant sciences team project. || 
|-id=543
| 28543 Solis-Gozar ||  || Angel Francisco Solis Gozar (born 1995) was awarded second place in the 2011 Intel International Science and Engineering Fair for his plant sciences team project. || 
|-id=547
| 28547 Johannschröter ||  || Johann Hieronymus Schröter (1745–1816) was a lunar astronomer influenced by William Herschel and who later influenced Karl Ludwig Harding and Fredrich Wilhelm Bessel || 
|-id=551
| 28551 Paulomi ||  || Paulomi Bhattacharya (born 1994) is a finalist in the 2013 Intel Science Talent Search, a science competition for high-school seniors, for her chemistry project || 
|-id=553
| 28553 Bhupatiraju ||  || Surya Narayanaraju Bhupatiraju (born 1995) is a finalist in the 2013 Intel Science Talent Search, a science competition for high-school seniors, for his mathematics project || 
|-id=554
| 28554 Adambowman ||  || Adam Joseph Bowman (born 1995) is a finalist in the 2013 Intel Science Talent Search, a science competition for high-school seniors, for his engineering project. || 
|-id=555
| 28555 Jenniferchan ||  || Jennifer Chan (born 1994) is a finalist in the 2013 Intel Science Talent Search, a science competition for high-school seniors, for her biochemistry project || 
|-id=556
| 28556 Kevinchen ||  || Kevin Chen (born 1995) is a finalist in the 2013 Intel Science Talent Search, a science competition for high-school seniors, for his engineering project || 
|-id=557
| 28557 Lillianchin ||  || Lillian Tiffany Chin (born 1995) is a finalist in the 2013 Intel Science Talent Search, a science competition for high-school seniors, for her bioengineering project || 
|-id=558
| 28558 Kathcordwell ||  || Katherine Leigh Cordwell (born 1995) is a finalist in the 2013 Intel Science Talent Search, a science competition for high-school seniors, for her mathematics project || 
|-id=559
| 28559 Anniedai ||  || Annie Dai (born 1995) is a finalist in the 2013 Intel Science Talent Search, a science competition for high-school seniors, for her materials science project || 
|-id=563
| 28563 Dantzler ||  || Alexa Victoria Dantzler (born 1995) is a finalist in the 2013 Intel Science Talent Search, a science competition for high-school seniors, for her chemistry project || 
|-id=564
| 28564 Gunderman ||  || Lane Gunderman (born 1994) is a finalist in the 2013 Intel Science Talent Search, a science competition for high-school seniors, for his chemistry project || 
|-id=568
| 28568 Jacobjohnson ||  || Jacob Paul Smullin Johnson (born 1995) is a finalist in the 2013 Intel Science Talent Search, a science competition for high-school seniors, for his bioinformatics and genomics project || 
|-id=569
| 28569 Kallenbach ||  || Jonah Kallenbach (born 1995) is a finalist in the 2013 Intel Science Talent Search, a science competition for high-school seniors, for his bioinformatics and genomics project || 
|-id=570
| 28570 Peterkraft ||  || Peter Kraft (born 1995) is a finalist in the 2013 Intel Science Talent Search, a science competition for high-school seniors, for his chemistry project || 
|-id=571
| 28571 Hannahlarson ||  || Hannah Kerner Larson (born 1994) is a finalist in the 2013 Intel Science Talent Search, a science competition for high-school seniors, for her mathematics project || 
|-id=572
| 28572 Salebreton ||  || Stephen Adam Le Breton (born 1995) is a finalist in the 2013 Intel Science Talent Search, a science competition for high-school seniors, for his medicine and health project || 
|-id=575
| 28575 McQuaid ||  || Daniel Conor McQuaid (born 1995) is a finalist in the 2013 Intel Science Talent Search, a science competition for high-school seniors, for his biochemistry project || 
|-id=583
| 28583 Mehrotra ||  || Pavan N. Mehrotra (born 1995) is a finalist in the 2013 Intel Science Talent Search, a science competition for high-school seniors, for his engineering project || 
|-id=587
| 28587 Mundkur ||  || Naethan Sid Mundkur (born 1995) is a finalist in the 2013 Intel Science Talent Search, a science competition for high-school seniors, for his materials science project || 
|-id=592
| 28592 O'Leary ||  || Vincent Jacob O'Leary (born 1995) is a finalist in the 2013 Intel Science Talent Search, a science competition for high-school seniors, for his animal sciences project || 
|-id=594
| 28594 Ronaldballouz ||  || Ronald Ballouz (born 1989) is a postdoctoral scholar at the Lunar and Planetary Laboratory (Tucson, AZ) focusing on computer simulations of grain interactions throughout the Solar System, including the surfaces of small bodies relevant for missions. || 
|-id=598
| 28598 Apadmanabha ||  || Akshay Padmanabha (born 1996) is a finalist in the 2013 Intel Science Talent Search, a science competition for high-school seniors, for his bioengineering project || 
|-id=599
| 28599 Terenzoni ||  || Michael Terenzoni (born 1964) served as the Astronomy Coordinator at Flandrau Science Center. He later worked as an Observatory Specialist with Steward Observatory at the University of Arizona. This has made him well known and liked among both the professional and amateur astronomical communities in southern Arizona. || 
|-id=600
| 28600 Georgelucas ||  || George Lucas (born 1944) is best known as the director of the films American Graffiti and Star Wars. || 
|}

28601–28700 

|-
| 28601 Benton ||  || Julius Benton (born 1949) has been a key member of the Association of Lunar and Planetary Observers (ALPO) serving as Saturn & Venus Coordinators since 1971. || 
|-id=602
| 28602 Westfall ||  || John Westfall (born 1938), a Professor Emeritus at San Francisco State University and the former Executive Director of the Association of Lunar & Planetary Observers (1985–1995) || 
|-id=603
| 28603 Jenkins ||  || Jamey Jenkins (born 1955), an American amateur astronomer who served as Assistant Coordinator-Archivist for the Association of Lunar and Planetary Observers from 2003 to 2014 and is author of The Sun and How to Observe It. || 
|-id=607
| 28607 Jiayipeng ||  || Jiayi Peng (born 1995) is a finalist in the 2013 Intel Science Talent Search, a science competition for high-school seniors, for her physics and space science project || 
|-id=609
| 28609 Tsirvoulis ||  || Georgios Tsirvoulis (born 1987) is a postdoctoral researcher at the Luleå University of Technology (Sweden) whose studies include the identification and long-term dynamical evolution of collisional asteroid families. || 
|-id=611
| 28611 Liliapopova ||  || Lilia Popova (born 1995) is a finalist in the 2013 Intel Science Talent Search, a science competition for high-school seniors, for her plant science project || 
|-id=614
| 28614 Vejvoda ||  || Jaromír Vejvoda, Czech musician, bandmaster and composer † || 
|-id=618
| 28618 Scibelli ||  || Samantha Marie Scibelli (born 1995) is a finalist in the 2013 Intel Science Talent Search, a science competition for high-school seniors, for her physics and space science project || 
|-id=625
| 28625 Selvakumar ||  || Raja Selvakumar (born 1995) is a finalist in the 2013 Intel Science Talent Search, a science competition for high-school seniors, for his biochemistry project || 
|-id=626
| 28626 Meghanshea ||  || Meghan Marjorie Shea (born 1994) is a finalist in the 2013 Intel Science Talent Search, a science competition for high-school seniors, for her environmental science project || 
|-id=628
| 28628 Kensenshi ||  || Kensen Shi (born 1995) is a finalist in the 2013 Intel Science Talent Search, a science competition for high-school seniors, for his computer science project || 
|-id=629
| 28629 Solimano ||  || Jamie Lee Solimano (born 1995) is a finalist in the 2013 Intel Science Talent Search, a science competition for high-school seniors, for her microbiology project || 
|-id=630
| 28630 Mayuri ||  || Mayuri Sridhar (born 1995) is a finalist in the 2013 Intel Science Talent Search, a science competition for high-school seniors, for her biochemistry project || 
|-id=631
| 28631 Jacktakahashi ||  || Jack Ryan Takahashi (born 1995) is a finalist in the 2013 Intel Science Talent Search, a science competition for high-school seniors, for his medicine and health project || 
|-id=632
| 28632 Christraver ||  || Chris Traver (born 1995) is a finalist in the 2013 Intel Science Talent Search, a science competition for high-school seniors, for his behavioral and social sciences project || 
|-id=633
| 28633 Ratripathi ||  || Raghav Tripathi (born 1995) is a finalist in the 2013 Intel Science Talent Search, a science competition for high-school seniors, for his biochemistry project || 
|-id=636
| 28636 Vasudevan ||  || Sahana Vasudevan (born 1997) is a finalist in the 2013 Intel Science Talent Search, a science competition for high-school seniors, for her mathematics project || 
|-id=638
| 28638 Joywang ||  || Joy Yiran Wang (born 1995) is a finalist in the 2013 Intel Science Talent Search, a science competition for high-school seniors, for her chemistry project || 
|-id=640
| 28640 Cathywong ||  || Catherine Wong (born 1995) is a finalist in the 2013 Intel Science Talent Search, a science competition for high-school seniors, for her bioengineering project || 
|-id=642
| 28642 Zbarsky ||  || Samuel Zbarsky (born 1995) is a finalist in the 2013 Intel Science Talent Search, a science competition for high-school seniors, for his mathematics project || 
|-id=643
| 28643 Kellyzhang ||  || Kelly Zhang (born 1995) is a finalist in the 2013 Intel Science Talent Search, a science competition for high-school seniors, for her bioengineering project || 
|-id=644
| 28644 Michaelzhang ||  || Michael Zhang (born 1994) is a finalist in the 2013 Intel Science Talent Search, a science competition for high-school seniors, for his behavioral and social sciences project. He attends the Smithtown High School East, Saint James, New York || 
|-id=652
| 28652 Andybramante ||  || Andrew Bramante mentored a finalist in the 2013 Intel Science Talent Search, a science competition for high-school seniors || 
|-id=653
| 28653 Charliebrucker ||  || Charles F. Brucker mentored a finalist in the 2013 Intel Science Talent Search, a science competition for high-school seniors || 
|-id=654
| 28654 Davidcaine ||  || David Caine mentored a finalist in the 2013 Intel Science Talent Search, a science competition for high-school seniors || 
|-id=655
| 28655 Erincolfax ||  || Erin Colfax mentored a finalist in the 2013 Intel Science Talent Search, a science competition for high-school seniors || 
|-id=656
| 28656 Doreencurtin ||  || Doreen Curtin mentored a finalist in the 2013 Intel Science Talent Search, a science competition for high-school seniors || 
|-id=657
| 28657 Briandempsey ||  || Brian Dempsey mentored a finalist in the 2013 Intel Science Talent Search, a science competition for high-school seniors || 
|-id=660
| 28660 Derbes ||  || David Derbes mentored a finalist in the 2013 Intel Science Talent Search, a science competition for high-school seniors || 
|-id=661
| 28661 Jimdickens ||  || James Dickens mentored a finalist in the 2013 Intel Science Talent Search, a science competition for high-school seniors || 
|-id=662
| 28662 Ericduran ||  || Eric Duran mentored a finalist in the 2013 Intel Science Talent Search, a science competition for high-school seniors || 
|-id=664
| 28664 Maryellenfay ||  || Mary Ellen Fay mentored a finalist in the 2013 Intel Science Talent Search, a science competition for high-school seniors || 
|-id=665
| 28665 Theresafultz ||  || Theresa Fultz mentored a finalist in the 2013 Intel Science Talent Search, a science competition for high-school seniors || 
|-id=666
| 28666 Trudygessler ||  || Trudy Gessler mentored a finalist in the 2013 Intel Science Talent Search, a science competition for high-school seniors || 
|-id=667
| 28667 Whithagins ||  || Whitney Hagins mentored a finalist in the 2013 Intel Science Talent Search, a science competition for high-school seniors || 
|-id=669
| 28669 Bradhelsel ||  || Bradley Helsel mentored a finalist in the 2013 Intel Science Talent Search, a science competition for high-school seniors || 
|-id=672
| 28672 Karolhiggins ||  || Karol Higgins mentored a finalist in the 2013 Intel Science Talent Search, a science competition for high-school seniors || 
|-id=673
| 28673 Valholmes ||  || Valerie M. Holmes mentored a finalist in the 2013 Intel Science Talent Search, a science competition for high-school seniors || 
|-id=675
| 28675 Suejohnston ||  || Susanne C. Johnston mentored a finalist in the 2013 Intel Science Talent Search, a science competition for high-school seniors || 
|-id=676
| 28676 Bethkoester ||  || Beth Koester mentored a finalist in the 2013 Intel Science Talent Search, a science competition for high-school seniors || 
|-id=677
| 28677 Laurakowalski ||  || Laura Kowalski mentored a finalist in the 2013 Intel Science Talent Search, a science competition for high-school seniors || 
|-id=678
| 28678 Lindquester ||  || Terri E. Lindquester mentored a finalist in the 2013 Intel Science Talent Search, a science competition for high-school seniors || 
|-id=680
| 28680 Sandralitvin ||  || Sandra Litvin mentored a finalist in the 2013 Intel Science Talent Search, a science competition for high-school seniors || 
|-id=681
| 28681 Loseke ||  || Meghann Loseke mentored a finalist in the 2013 Intel Science Talent Search, a science competition for high-school seniors || 
|-id=682
| 28682 Newhams ||  || Mike Newhams mentored a finalist in the 2013 Intel Science Talent Search, a science competition for high-school seniors || 
|-id=683
| 28683 Victorostrik ||  || Victor Ostrik mentored a finalist in the 2013 Intel Science Talent Search, a science competition for high-school seniors || 
|-id=686
| 28686 Tamsenprofit ||  || Tamsen Profit mentored a finalist in the 2013 Intel Science Talent Search, a science competition for high-school seniors || 
|-id=687
| 28687 Reginareals ||  || Regina A. Reals mentored a finalist in the 2013 Intel Science Talent Search, a science competition for high-school seniors || 
|-id=688
| 28688 Diannerister ||  || Dianne E. Rister mentored a finalist in the 2013 Intel Science Talent Search, a science competition for high-school seniors || 
|-id=689
| 28689 Rohrback ||  || Joan Rohrback mentored a finalist in the 2013 Intel Science Talent Search, a science competition for high-school seniors || 
|-id=690
| 28690 Beshellem ||  || Bernie Shellem mentored a finalist in the 2013 Intel Science Talent Search, a science competition for high-school seniors || 
|-id=692
| 28692 Chanleysmall ||  || Chanley M. Small mentored a finalist in the 2013 Intel Science Talent Search, a science competition for high-school seniors || 
|-id=695
| 28695 Zwanzig ||  || Glenn "Skip" Zwanzig mentored a finalist in the 2013 Intel Science Talent Search, a science competition for high-school seniors || 
|-id=697
| 28697 Eitanacks ||  || Eitan Samuel Acks (born 1999) is a finalist in the 2013 Broadcom MASTERS, a math and science competition for middle school students, for his engineering project. || 
|-id=698
| 28698 Aakshi ||  || Aakshi Agarwal (born 1999) is a finalist in the 2013 Broadcom MASTERS, a math and science competition for middle school students, for her biochemistry, medicine, health science, and microbiology project. || 
|-id=700
| 28700 Balachandar ||  || Sidhika Balachandar (born 1999) is a finalist in the 2013 Broadcom MASTERS, a math and science competition for middle school students, for her physical sciences project. || 
|}

28701–28800 

|-id=705
| 28705 Michaelbecker ||  || Michael David Becker (born 1999) is a finalist in the 2013 Broadcom MASTERS, a math and science competition for middle school students, for his physical sciences project. || 
|-id=707
| 28707 Drewbecker ||  || Drew William Becker (born 2000) is a finalist in the 2013 Broadcom MASTERS, a math and science competition for middle school students, for his environmental sciences project. || 
|-id=710
| 28710 Rebeccab ||  || Rebecca Ann Bloomfield (born 1999) is a finalist in the 2013 Broadcom MASTERS, a math and science competition for middle school students, for her earth and space sciences project. || 
|-id=711
| 28711 Oliverburnett ||  || Oliver Burnett (born 2000) is a finalist in the 2013 Broadcom MASTERS, a math and science competition for middle school students, for his earth and space sciences project. He attends the Ellis School, Pittsburgh, Pennsylvania. || 
|-id=712
| 28712 Elizabethcorn ||  || Elizabeth Alyn Corn (born 1999) is a finalist in the 2013 Broadcom MASTERS, a math and science competition for middle school students, for her biochemistry, medicine, health science, and microbiology project. || 
|-id=714
| 28714 Gandall ||  || Keoni K. Gandall (born 1999) is a finalist in the 2013 Broadcom MASTERS, a math and science competition for middle school students, for his biochemistry, medicine, health science, and microbiology project. || 
|-id=715
| 28715 Garimella ||  || Mihir Tejas Garimella (born 1999) is a finalist in the 2013 Broadcom MASTERS, a math and science competition for middle school students, for his engineering project. || 
|-id=716
| 28716 Calebgonser ||  || Caleb Allen Tuttle Gonser (born 2000) is a finalist in the 2013 Broadcom MASTERS, a math and science competition for middle school students, for his animal & plant sciences project. || 
|-id=718
| 28718 Rivergrace ||  || River Connell Grace (born 1999) is a finalist in the 2013 Broadcom MASTERS, a math and science competition for middle school students, for his animal & plant sciences project. || 
|-id=719
| 28719 Sahoolahan ||  || Seamus Andrew Hoolahan (born 2000) is a finalist in the 2013 Broadcom MASTERS, a math and science competition for middle school students, for his physical sciences project. || 
|-id=720
| 28720 Krystalrose ||  || Krystal Rose Horton (born 2001) is a finalist in the 2013 Broadcom MASTERS, a math and science competition for middle school students, for her animal & plant sciences project. || 
|-id=722
| 28722 Dhruviyer ||  || Dhruv Iyer (born 1999) is a finalist in the 2013 Broadcom MASTERS, a math and science competition for middle school students, for his mathematics and computer science project. || 
|-id=723
| 28723 Cameronjones ||  || Cameron Cole Jones (born 2001) is a finalist in the 2013 Broadcom MASTERS, a math and science competition for middle school students, for his engineering project. || 
|-id=726
| 28726 Kailey-Steiner ||  || Johann Rod Kailey-Steiner (born 1999) is a finalist in the 2013 Broadcom MASTERS, a math and science competition for middle school students, for his engineering project. || 
|-id=729
| 28729 Moivre ||  || Abraham de Moivre (1667–1754), French mathematician. || 
|-id=732
| 28732 Rheakamat ||  || Rhea G. Kamat (born 1998) is a finalist in the 2013 Broadcom MASTERS, a math and science competition for middle school students, for her animal & plant sciences project. || 
|-id=734
| 28734 Austinmccoy ||  || Austin Sagan McCoy (born 2000) is a finalist in the 2013 Broadcom MASTERS, a math and science competition for middle school students, for his biochemistry, medicine, health science, and microbiology project. || 
|-id=737
| 28737 Mohindra ||  || Smita Mohindra (born 2000) is a finalist in the 2013 Broadcom MASTERS, a math and science competition for middle school students, for her engineering project.. || 
|-id=738
| 28738 Carolinolan ||  || Caroline Grace Nolan (born 2000) is a finalist in the 2013 Broadcom MASTERS, a math and science competition for middle school students, for her animal & plant sciences project. || 
|-id=739
| 28739 Julisauer ||  || Julienne Isabelle Sauer (born 1999) is a finalist in the 2013 Broadcom MASTERS, a math and science competition for middle school students, for her physical sciences project. || 
|-id=740
| 28740 Nathansperry ||  || Nathaniel Poort Sperry (born 1999) is a finalist in the 2013 Broadcom MASTERS, a math and science competition for middle school students, for his physical sciences project. || 
|-id=742
| 28742 Hannahsteele ||  || Hannah Mae Steele (born 2000) is a finalist in the 2013 Broadcom MASTERS, a math and science competition for middle school students, for her earth and space sciences project. || 
|-id=747
| 28747 Swintosky ||  || Megan Christine Swintosky (born 1999) is a finalist in the 2013 Broadcom MASTERS, a math and science competition for middle school students, for her biochemistry, medicine, health science, and microbiology project. || 
|-id=750
| 28750 Brennawallin ||  || Brenna Caroline Wallin (born 2001) is a finalist in the 2013 Broadcom MASTERS, a math and science competition for middle school students, for her environmental sciences project. || 
|-id=757
| 28757 Seanweber ||  || Sean Austin Weber (born 2000) is a finalist in the 2013 Broadcom MASTERS, a math and science competition for middle school students, for his animal & plant sciences project. || 
|-id=759
| 28759 Joshwentzel ||  || Joshua Wentzel (born 1999) is a finalist in the 2013 Broadcom MASTERS, a math and science competition for middle school students, for his physical sciences project. || 
|-id=760
| 28760 Grantwomble ||  || Grant Donovan Womble (born 2000) is a finalist in the 2013 Broadcom MASTERS, a math and science competition for middle school students, for his engineering project.  || 
|-id=765
| 28765 Katherinewu ||  || Katherine Jean Wu (born 2000) is a finalist in the 2013 Broadcom MASTERS, a math and science competition for middle school students, for her behavioral and social sciences project. || 
|-id=766
| 28766 Monge ||  || Gaspard Monge, French mathematician. || 
|-id=770
| 28770 Sarahrines ||  || Sarah Rines mentored a finalist in the 2013 Broadcom MASTERS, a math and science competition for middle school students. || 
|-id=778
| 28778 Michdelucia ||  || Michelle DeLucia mentored a finalist in the 2013 Broadcom MASTERS, a math and science competition for middle school students. || 
|-id=779
| 28779 Acthieke ||  || Adrienne C. Thieke mentored a finalist in the 2013 Broadcom MASTERS, a math and science competition for middle school students. || 
|-id=780
| 28780 Lisadeaver ||  || Lisa Deaver mentored a finalist in the 2013 Broadcom MASTERS, a math and science competition for middle school students || 
|-id=781
| 28781 Timothylohr ||  || Timothy Lohr mentored a finalist in the 2013 Broadcom MASTERS, a math and science competition for middle school students. || 
|-id=782
| 28782 Mechling ||  || Kim Mechling mentored a finalist in the 2013 Broadcom MASTERS, a math and science competition for middle school students. || 
|-id=784
| 28784 Deringer ||  || Nancy Deringer mentored a finalist in the 2013 Broadcom MASTERS, a math and science competition for middle school students. || 
|-id=785
| 28785 Woodjohn ||  || John Wood mentored a finalist in the 2013 Broadcom MASTERS, a math and science competition for middle school students. || 
|-id=787
| 28787 Peterpinko ||  || Peter Pinko mentored a finalist in the 2013 Broadcom MASTERS, a math and science competition for middle school students. || 
|-id=788
| 28788 Hayes-Gehrke ||  || Melissa Hayes-Gehrke (born 1973) is an astronomy instructor at the University of Maryland who introduces the techniques of asteroid light curve photometry as a method of teaching observational astronomy, with students often producing publishable results. || 
|-id=791
| 28791 Edithsykeslowell ||  || Edith Sykes Lowell (born 1927), with her husband David, have been supporters of Lowell Observatory. Edith is the granddaughter of Stanley Sykes. The Sykes brothers (Stanley and Godfrey) built the dome which houses Lowell's 24-inch historic refractor telescope. || 
|-id=792
| 28792 Davidlowell ||  || James David Lowell (1928–2020) was a long-time supporter of Lowell Observatory.  He was a descendant of Percival Lowell, who brought the family to the U.S. from England in the 1600s. James had a degree in geology and located a large copper mine in Chile and a major gold mine in Peru. || 
|-id=793
| 28793 Donaldpaul ||  || Donald Paul (born 1946) is a long-time member of Lowell Observatory's Advisory Board. Don supported the Giovale Open Deck Observatory with a TEC telescope which enhances visitors views of our solar system. || 
|-id=794
| 28794 Crowley ||  || Leo Crowley (born 1944) is a long-time member of Lowell Observatory's Advisory Board. Leo serves on Lowell's Executive Committee and as Chair of Lowell's Audit Committee. || 
|-id=800
| 28800 Speth ||  || Dustin Speth mentored a finalist in the 2013 Broadcom MASTERS, a math and science competition for middle school students. || 
|}

28801–28900 

|-
| 28801 Maryanderson ||  || Mary Anderson mentored a finalist in the 2013 Broadcom MASTERS, a math and science competition for middle school students. || 
|-id=802
| 28802 Boborino ||  || Bob Orino mentored a finalist in the 2013 Broadcom MASTERS, a math and science competition for middle school students. || 
|-id=803
| 28803 Roe ||  || Henry G. Roe (born 1975), is an assistant astronomer at Lowell Observatory || 
|-id=807
| 28807 Lisawaller ||  || Lisa Waller mentored a finalist in the 2013 Broadcom MASTERS, a math and science competition for middle school students. || 
|-id=808
| 28808 Ananthnarayan ||  || Vidya Ananthnarayan mentored a finalist in the 2013 Broadcom MASTERS, a math and science competition for middle school students. || 
|-id=810
| 28810 Suchandler ||  || Suzanne Chandler mentored a finalist in the 2013 Broadcom MASTERS, a math and science competition for middle school students. || 
|-id=813
| 28813 Jeffreykurtz ||  || Jeffrey Kurtz mentored a finalist in the 2013 Broadcom MASTERS, a math and science competition for middle school students. || 
|-id=816
| 28816 Kimneville ||  || Kim Neville mentored a finalist in the 2013 Broadcom MASTERS, a math and science competition for middle school students. || 
|-id=817
| 28817 Simoneflood ||  || Simone Flood mentored a finalist in the 2013 Broadcom MASTERS, a math and science competition for middle school students. || 
|-id=818
| 28818 Kellyryan ||  || Kelly Ryan mentored a finalist in the 2013 Broadcom MASTERS, a math and science competition for middle school students. || 
|-id=819
| 28819 Karinritchey ||  || Karin Ritchey mentored a finalist in the 2013 Broadcom MASTERS, a math and science competition for middle school students. || 
|-id=820
| 28820 Sylrobertson ||  || Sylvia Robertson mentored a finalist in the 2013 Broadcom MASTERS, a math and science competition for middle school students. || 
|-id=821
| 28821 Harryanselmo ||  || Sylvia Robertson mentored a finalist in the 2013 Broadcom MASTERS, a math and science competition for middle school students. || 
|-id=822
| 28822 Angelabarker ||  || Angela Barker mentored a finalist in the 2013 Broadcom MASTERS, a math and science competition for middle school students. || 
|-id=823
| 28823 Archibald ||  || Angela Barker mentored a finalist in the 2013 Broadcom MASTERS, a math and science competition for middle school students. || 
|-id=824
| 28824 Marlablair ||  || Marla Blair mentored a finalist in the 2013 Broadcom MASTERS, a math and science competition for middle school students. || 
|-id=825
| 28825 Bryangoehring ||  || Bryan S. Goehring mentored a finalist in the 2013 Broadcom MASTERS, a math and science competition for middle school students. || 
|-id=828
| 28828 Aalamiharandi ||  || Arshia Aalami Harandi (born 1995) was awarded second place in the 2013 Intel International Science and Engineering Fair for his behavioral and social sciences project. || 
|-id=829
| 28829 Abelsky ||  || Julia Beth Abelsky (born 1994) was awarded second place in the 2013 Intel International Science and Engineering Fair for her materials and bioengineering project. || 
|-id=831
| 28831 Abu-Alshaikh ||  || Salahaldeen Ibrahim Abu-Alshaikh (born 1997) was awarded second place in the 2013 Intel International Science and Engineering Fair for his mathematical sciences project. || 
|-id=832
| 28832 Akana ||  || Reid Toshio Kealii Akana (born 1996) was awarded second place in the 2013 Intel International Science and Engineering Fair for his plant sciences project. || 
|-id=833
| 28833 Arunachalam ||  || Easun Piraichoody Arunachalam (born 1996) was awarded second place in the 2013 Intel International Science and Engineering Fair for his medicine and health sciences project. || 
|-id=836
| 28836 Ashmore ||  || Elisabeth Anne Ashmore (born 1996) was awarded second place in the 2013 Intel International Science and Engineering Fair for her computer science project. || 
|-id=837
| 28837 Nibalachandar ||  || Niranjan Balachandar (born 1997) was awarded second place in the 2013 Intel International Science and Engineering Fair for his mathematical sciences team project. || 
|-id=841
| 28841 Kelseybarter ||  || Kelsey Mackenzie Barter (born 1996) was awarded second place in the 2013 Intel International Science and Engineering Fair for her biochemistry project. || 
|-id=842
| 28842 Bhowmik ||  || Aprotim Cory Bhowmik (born 1996) was awarded second place in the 2013 Intel International Science and Engineering Fair for his medicine and health sciences project. || 
|-id=848
| 28848 Nicolemarie ||  || Nicole Marie Biddinger (born 1995) was awarded first place in the 2013 Intel International Science and Engineering Fair for her animal sciences project. || 
|-id=851
| 28851 Londonbolsius ||  || London Reeve Bolsius (born 1997) was awarded second place in the 2013 Intel International Science and Engineering Fair for his computer science project. || 
|-id=852
| 28852 Westonbraun ||  || Weston Daniel Braun (born 1995) was awarded second place in the 2013 Intel International Science and Engineering Fair for his electrical and mechanical engineering project. || 
|-id=853
| 28853 Bukhamsin ||  || Abdullah Hassan Bu Khamsin (born 1995) was awarded second place in the 2013 Intel International Science and Engineering Fair for his plant sciences project. || 
|-id=854
| 28854 Budisteanu ||  || Ionut Alexandru Budisteanu (born 1993) was awarded best of category and first place in the 2013 Intel International Science and Engineering Fair for his computer science project. || 
|-id=855
| 28855 Burchell ||  || Sydney Veronica Burchell (born 1996) was awarded first place in the 2013 Intel International Science and Engineering Fair for her environmental management team project. || 
|-id=860
| 28860 Cappelletto ||  || Massimo Cappelletto (born 1993) was awarded second place in the 2013 Intel International Science and Engineering Fair for his energy and transportation team project. || 
|-id=866
| 28866 Chakraborty ||  || Uttara Chakraborty (born 1995) was awarded second place in the 2013 Intel International Science and Engineering Fair for her computer science project. || 
|-id=868
| 28868 Rianchandra ||  || Rian Naveen Chandra (born 1995) was awarded second place in the 2013 Intel International Science and Engineering Fair for his physics and astronomy team project. || 
|-id=869
| 28869 Chaubal ||  || Manotri Chaubal (born 1996) was awarded second place in the 2013 Intel International Science and Engineering Fair for her cellular and molecular biology project. || 
|-id=874
| 28874 Michaelchen ||  || Michael Zhu Chen (born 1996) was awarded first place in the 2013 Intel International Science and Engineering Fair for his chemistry project. || 
|-id=878
| 28878 Segner ||  || Ján Andrej Segner (Johan  Andreas von Segner), Carpatho-German mathematician, physicist, doctor † || 
|-id=884
| 28884 Youngjunchoi ||  || Young-Jun Choi (born 1969) is a planetary scientist at Korea Astronomy and Space Science Institute (Daejeon, South Korea). He studies photometry and thermal models of Kuiper belt objects and is Co-I of DEEP-South, a project to observe asteroids and comets in the southern sky. || 
|-id=886
| 28886 Ericajawin ||  || Erica R. Jawin (born 1989) is a postdoctoral researcher at the Smithsonian National Museum of Natural History (Washington, DC) working on the OSIRIS-REx mission sample site selection. Her wide range of research expertise spans studies of Mars, the moon and now asteroids. || 
|-id=894
| 28894 Ryanchung ||  || Ryan Kyong-Doc Chung (born 1996) was awarded first place in the 2013 Intel International Science and Engineering Fair for his computer science project. || 
|}

28901–29000 

|-id=912
| 28912 Sonahosseini ||  || Sona Hosseini (born 1982) is a research and instrument scientist at the Jet Propulsion Laboratory. She has led numerous studies to simulate and study low-density gas environments in our solar system and conceptualized innovative technology to enable such measurements in future NASA missions. || 
|-id=916
| 28916 Logancollins ||  || Logan Thrasher Collins (born 1996) was awarded second place in the 2013 Intel International Science and Engineering Fair for his microbiology project. || 
|-id=917
| 28917 Zacollins ||  || Zachary White Collins (born 1996) was awarded second place in the 2013 Intel International Science and Engineering Fair for his physics and astronomy team project. || 
|-id=924
| 28924 Jennanncsele ||  || Jennifer Ann Csele (born 1996) was awarded first place in the 2013 Intel International Science and Engineering Fair for her physics and astronomy project. || 
|-id=934
| 28934 Meagancurrie ||  || Meagan Elizabeth Currie (born 1996) was awarded second place in the 2013 Intel International Science and Engineering Fair for her animal sciences project. || 
|-id=935
| 28935 Kevincyr ||  || Kevin James Cyr (born 1994) was awarded second place in the 2013 Intel InternationalScience and Engineering Fair for his microbiology project. || 
|-id=936
| 28936 Dalapati ||  || Trisha Dalapati (born 1997) was awarded second place in the 2013 Intel International Science and Engineering Fair for her energy and transportation project. || 
|-id=942
| 28942 Yennydieguez ||  || Yenny Dieguez (born 1997) was awarded second place in the 2013 Intel International Science and Engineering Fair for her electrical and mechanical engineering project. || 
|-id=945
| 28945 Taideding ||  || Yenny Dieguez (born 1997) was awarded second place in the 2013 Intel International Science and Engineering Fair for her electrical and mechanical engineering project. || 
|-id=948
| 28948 Disalvo ||  || Samantha Hayley DiSalvo (born 1996) was awarded best of category and first place in the 2013 Intel International Science and Engineering Fair for her plant sciences team project. || 
|-id=950
| 28950 Ailisdooner ||  || Ailis Clare Dooner (born 1996) was awarded second place in the 2013 Intel International Science and Engineering Fair for her biochemistry project. || 
|-id=952
| 28952 Ericepstein ||  || Eric Samuel Epstein (born 1995) was awarded second place in the 2013 Intel International Science and Engineering Fair for his animal sciences project. || 
|-id=953
| 28953 Hollyerickson ||  || Holly Catherine Erickson (born 1995) was awarded second place in the 2013 Intel International Science and Engineering Fair for her materials and bioengineering project. || 
|-id=954
| 28954 Feiyiou ||  || Fei Yiou (born 1995) was awarded second place in the 2013 Intel International Science and Engineering Fair for her electrical and mechanical engineering team project. || 
|-id=955
| 28955 Kaliadeborah ||  || Kalia Deborah Firester (born 1997) was awarded second place in the 2013 Intel International Science and Engineering Fair for her plant sciences project. || 
|-id=957
| 28957 Danielfulop ||  || Daniel Jeremy Fulop (born 1995) was awarded first place in the 2013 Intel International Science and Engineering Fair for his cellular and molecular biology project. || 
|-id=958
| 28958 Binns ||  || Hilda Binns (born 1945) is a retired multi-sport athlete who won Canada's first Paralympic gold medal in Tel Aviv in 1968. She won a total of six medals in two Paralympics and many medals and honors in other national and international competitions. || 
|-id=963
| 28963 Tamyiu ||  || Tam Yiu (born 1928), a driving instructor by profession, had inspired thousands of followers who study his teachings in Tai Chi philosophy. || 
|-id=966
| 28966 Yuyingshih ||  || Yu Ying-shih (1930–2021) is a renowned Chinese-American historian and Sinologist. He was a tenured professor at Harvard University, Yale University and Princeton University. He won the Tang Prize and used the NT\$10 million prize money to establish the Yu Ying-shih Fellowship for the Humanities. || 
|-id=967
| 28967 Gerhardter ||  || Herbert Gerhardter (born 1993) was awarded second place in the 2013 Intel International Science and Engineering Fair for his energy and transportation team project. || 
|-id=968
| 28968 Gongmiaoxin ||  || Gong Miaoxin (born 1995) was awarded second place in the 2013 Intel International Science and Engineering Fair for her electrical and mechanical engineering team project. || 
|-id=969
| 28969 Youngminjeongahn ||  || Youngmin JeongAhn (born 1980) is a postdoctoral researcher at Korea Astronomy and Space Science Institute (Daejeon, South Korea) who works on dynamics of small solar system bodies. He has discovered more than one hundred asteroids including four near-Earth objects and twenty Jupiter trojans. || 
|-id=978
| 28978 Ixion ||  || Ixion tried to win the love of Hera, but Zeus thwarted this by creating the cloud Nephele, which resembled Hera and by whom Ixion fathered the Centaurs. For his crimes Ixion was bound to a wheel that turns forever in the underworld. || 
|-id=980
| 28980 Chowyunfat ||  || Chow Yun-fat (born 1955) is an actor born in Hong Kong. He is best known for his roles as Sao Feng in Pirates of the Caribbean: At World's End. He has won three Hong Kong Film Awards for Best Actor. His simple daily life style has won him the nickname "Son of Hong Kong". || 
|-id=983
| 28983 Omergranek ||  || Omer Granek (born 1995) was awarded second place in the 2013 Intel International Science and Engineering Fair for his electrical and mechanical engineering team project. || 
|-id=990
| 28990 Ariheinze ||  || Aren (Ari) Heinze (born 1979) is a postdoctoral fellow working on ATLAS at the University of Hawai'i (Manoa). His areas of study include Pluto and other dwarf planets, brown dwarfs, and asteroid discoveries. || 
|}

References 

028001-029000